Klink is a surname. Notable people with the surname include: 

 Ab Klink (born 1958), Dutch politician
 Al Klink (1915–1991), saxophonist
 Amyr Klink (born 1955), Brazilian navigator
 Gertrud Scholtz-Klink (1902–1999), German National Socialist leader
 Jan Klink (born 1985), Dutch politician
 Joanna Klink, author
 Joe Klink (born 1962), baseball player
 Ron Klink (born 1951), United States congressman from Pennsylvania
 Tamara Klink (chess player) (born 1967), German and Kazakh chess grandmaster

Fictional
 Colonel Klink, fictional character in the television series Hogan's Heroes
 Klink, a Pokémon from the Pokémon franchise

See also
 Klink, Germany, a municipality in Mecklenburg-Vorpommern, Germany
 Klinck
 "Klink", the 7th track on Death Grips' 2011 mixtape Exmilitary